The Eye of Judgment: Legends is a turn-based card battle video game for the PlayStation Portable. It is a spinoff of the 2007 PlayStation 3 release The Eye of Judgment. Unlike the original game, Legends uses a completely virtual card system rather than having the player own physical cards. With that in mind, it does not use the PSP's camera attachment.

External links
Official Eye of Judgment site

2010 video games
Digital collectible card games
PlayStation Network games
PlayStation Portable games
PlayStation Portable-only games
Video games developed in Japan
Video games scored by Takahiro Izutani